Ryan Fox may refer to:

 Ryan Fox (musician), member of The Good Life
 Ryan T. Fox (born 1980), American rower
 Ryan Fox (golfer) (born 1987), New Zealand golfer